Gastrodia sesamoides, commonly known as cinnamon bells or common potato orchid in Australia and as the pot-bellied orchid or cinnamon sticks in New Zealand, is a leafless, terrestrial saprophytic orchid in the family Orchidaceae. It has a thin, fleshy brown flowering stem and up to twenty five drooping, brownish, self-pollinating flowers that are white inside. Growing in a wide range of habitats, it is native to Australia and New Zealand.

Description
The flowers often produce an appealing cinnamon-like scent. Flowering occurs from September to January in Australia and from August to May in New Zealand, but the flowers are self-pollinating. Flowering is enhanced by fire the previous summer.

Taxonomy and naming
Gastrodia sesamoides was first formally described in 1810 by Robert Brown and the description was published in his book Prodromus Florae Novae Hollandiae. The specific epithet (sesamoides) refers to a supposed similarity to the sesame plant, the ending -oides being a Latin suffix meaning "like", "resembling" or "having the form of".

Distribution and habitat
Cinnamon bells is widespread and common, occurring south from the Darling Downs through the eastern half of New South Wales and the southern half of Victoria to Tasmania. It used to be found in the Sydney region but is now considered rare or extinct in that area. It is only found in the far southeast of South Australia, including on Kangaroo Island. It occurs on both the North and South Islands of New Zealand although only in the Marlborough and Nelson areas of the South Island. It grows in a wide variety of habitats, including forest and coastal scrub from lowland areas to subalpine habitats as long as there is adequate rainfall or soil moisture. In New Zealand it is often found in forestry plantations and in gardens where pine bark mulch is used.

Ecology
Because the potato orchid does not produce chlorophyll it is unable to make its own food via photosynthesis. Alternatively, it has a complex relationship with a fungus. The orchid receives its nutrients from the fungus, and the fungus obtains its habitat from the orchid and minerals and sugars from the roots of other forest trees.

Gastrodia sesamoides has been introduced to and is naturalised in South Africa.

Conservation
This orchid is common and widespread throughout most of its range but is classed as "rare" in South Australia.

Uses

Use as food
Indigenous Australians ate the roasted tubers of this orchid and it may have been one of the principal plants used by Tasmanian Aborigines. An early Victorian settler reported that Aboriginal peoples located the plants in habitat by observing where bandicoots had scratched in search of the tubers after detecting the plants underground by scent. The flavour of the tuber is said to resemble that of the beetroot, though insipid and watery.

Use in horticulture
Cultivation of Gastrodia sesamoides has yet to be achieved.

References

External links 
 

sesamoides
Orchids of New South Wales
Orchids of Victoria (Australia)
Orchids of Queensland
Orchids of South Australia
Orchids of Tasmania
Orchids of New Zealand
Bushfood
Plants described in 1810
Taxa named by Robert Brown (botanist, born 1773)